Tilehurst or Tilehurst Without is a civil parish in the district of West Berkshire, in the English county of Berkshire. It includes that part of the larger Reading suburb of  Tilehurst that lies outside the Reading Borough boundary, together with the northern part of the adjoining suburb of Calcot, and a small rural area west of the two suburbs.

The parish is bordered by the Borough of Reading, and the West Berkshire civil parishes of Holybrook, Theale, Sulham, and Purley on Thames. It lies entirely within the Reading West parliamentary constituency.

In the 2001 census there were 14,683 residents of the parish. Of these, 7,323 were male and 7,360 female, distributed among 5,571 households.  Of these, 11 people lived in communal establishments. The ratio of employed to unemployed residents is approximately 10:1. In addition to this are the 24% of residents who are neither employed nor unemployed but "economically inactive".  The average working resident works approximately 40 hours per week in managerial or professional employment.

The mean age of a parish resident is 37.47; the median is 38.00.

References

Tilehurst
West Berkshire District
Civil parishes in Berkshire